Komensky may refer to:

Komensky, Wisconsin, town in Jackson County, Wisconsin, United States
Komensky, Minnesota, unincorporated community in McLeod County, Minnesota, United States
1861 Komenský, a minor planet
John Amos Comenius (1592–1670, born Jan Amos Komenský), Czech philosopher